Nikolai Archilovich Zabolotny (born 16 April 1990) is a Russian football goalkeeper who plays for PFC Sochi.

Club career
During his time with FC Zenit St. Petersburg, he received several call-ups to the senior squad in 2008 and 2009, but remained on the bench in all of those games.

He made his debut for the main FC Spartak Moscow squad on 2 April 2011 in a Russian Premier League game against FC Kuban Krasnodar.

On 8 September 2017, his contract with FC Ural Yekaterinburg was dissolved by mutual consent.

Career statistics

Club

References

1990 births
Footballers from Saint Petersburg
Living people
Association football goalkeepers
Russian footballers
Russia youth international footballers
Russia under-21 international footballers
FC Zenit Saint Petersburg players
FC Spartak Moscow players
FC Spartak-2 Moscow players
FC Rostov players
FC Ural Yekaterinburg players
FC Rotor Volgograd players
PFC Sochi players
Russian Premier League players
Russian First League players
Russian Second League players